Jaslal Pradhan (born 24 April 1957) is an Indian boxer. He competed in the men's light welterweight event at the 1984 Summer Olympics. At the 1984 Summer Olympics, he lost to Dhawee Umponmaha of Thailand.

References

1957 births
Living people
Indian male boxers
Olympic boxers of India
Boxers at the 1984 Summer Olympics
Place of birth missing (living people)
Asian Games medalists in boxing
Boxers at the 1982 Asian Games
Asian Games bronze medalists for India
Medalists at the 1982 Asian Games
Light-welterweight boxers
Recipients of the Arjuna Award